Catocala palaeogama, the old wife underwing, is a moth of the family Erebidae. The species was first described by Achille Guenée in 1852. It is found in North America from Ontario and Quebec (where it is rare), through Maine, New Jersey, Tennessee, to South Carolina, west to Arkansas and Oklahoma and north through Iowa, Indiana, Illinois and Michigan.

Some authors consider Catocala palaeogama to be a synonym of Catocala neogama.

The wingspan is 60–70 mm. Adults are on wing from June to October depending on the location. There is probably one generation per year.

The larvae feed on Carya alba, C. glabra, C. illinoinensis, C. laciniosa, C. ovalis, C. ovata, Castanea dentata, Juglans nigra and Malus pumila.

References

External links
Oehlke, Bill. "Catocala muliercula Guenee, 1852". The Catocala Website. Archived May 14, 2008.

palaeogama
Moths of North America
Moths described in 1852